Lee Sun-hee (born October 21, 1978) is a female South Korean taekwondo practitioner and Olympic champion. She competed at the 2000 Summer Olympics in Sydney, where she won the gold medal in the 67 kg competition. She won 6–3 in the final against Trude Gundersen of Norway.

References

External links
 
 

1978 births
Living people
South Korean female taekwondo practitioners
Olympic taekwondo practitioners of South Korea
Taekwondo practitioners at the 2000 Summer Olympics
Olympic gold medalists for South Korea
Olympic medalists in taekwondo
Asian Games medalists in taekwondo
Taekwondo practitioners at the 1998 Asian Games
Medalists at the 2000 Summer Olympics
Asian Games silver medalists for South Korea
Medalists at the 1998 Asian Games
World Taekwondo Championships medalists
21st-century South Korean women